Yerucham Olshin is an Orthodox rabbi and a member of the Moetzes Gedolei HaTorah (Council of Torah Sages). He is one of the four roshei yeshiva (deans) of Beth Medrash Govoha, an Orthodox yeshiva located in Lakewood, New Jersey. The other rosh yeshivas are Rabbis Malkiel Kotler, Yisroel Neuman, and Dovid Schustal; they divide up the times they present shiurim (Torah lectures) to students on the Lakewood campus.

Olshin's works about Jewish holidays have been published under the title Yareach L'Moadim.
Olshin was a student of Rabbis Eliyahu Moshe Shisgal (son in law of Rabbi Moshe Feinstein), Abba Berman, and Shneur Kotler. He is married to Shalva, the daughter of Rabbi Dov Schwartzman, who is a granddaughter of the founder of the yeshiva, Rabbi Aharon Kotler.

References

Year of birth missing (living people)
Living people
20th-century American rabbis
21st-century American rabbis
American Haredi rabbis
Beth Medrash Govoha
Rosh yeshivas
Rabbis from New Jersey
People from Lakewood Township, New Jersey